Babouch is a village in northwestern Tunisia in the Jendouba Governorate, situated 25 kilometers south of Tabarka.

Communes of Tunisia